The eleventh season of The Voice Brasil, premiered on TV Globo on Tuesday, November 15, 2022, in the  (BRT / AMT) slot, immediately following the primetime telenovela Travessia.

Fátima Bernardes replaced André Marques as the main host, thus becoming the show's first female host. Thaís Fersoza (from The Voice +) replaced Jeniffer Nascimento as the show's backstage correspondent.

Lulu Santos, Michel Teló and Iza returned for their eleventh, eighth and fourth season as coaches, respectively, while Carlinhos Brown and Claudia Leitte were replaced by Gaby Amarantos.

On December 29, 2022, Keilla Júnia from Team Teló won the competition with 51.78% of the final vote over Bell Lins (Team Iza), Juceir Jr (Team Lulu) and Mila Santana (Team Gaby), marking Michel Teló's seventh victory in eight seasons as a coach.

Teams
 Key

Blind auditions
Key

Showdowns
The Showdowns was adapted from the second season of The Voice +. Coaches group their artists into three groups of four. In each group, two will advance to the Battles, while the remaining two can be stolen by the other coaches. Each coach can steal two losing artists from other teams. 

Key

Battles
For the Battles round, each coach divides their artists in pairs to sing the same song. The steals then returned this season, with two steals available for each coach. Contestants who win their battle, or stolen by another coach advance to the Cross Battles.

Key

Cross Battles
For the Cross Battles round, coaches selected an artist from their team, then challenged a fellow coach to compete against, and this coach selected an artist as well. The winner of each Cross battle is decided in consensus by the two coaches not involved in the battle. Coaches' names in bold means they were the challenger of the battle. In addition, 8 artists (2 per team) were given a "fast pass" by their coaches, while the remaining 16 competed for 8 spots in the Remix round.

Key

Remix

Key

Live shows

Semifinals
Key

Finals

Elimination chart
Key

Results

Ratings and reception

Brazilian ratings
All numbers are in points and provided by Kantar Ibope Media.

References

External links
Official website on Gshow.com

11
2022 Brazilian television seasons